Jarrod is a variant of the name  Jared.
Jarrod may refer to:

Jarrod Alexander, American drummer
Jarrod Atkinson, Australian rules footballer
Jarrod Bannister (1984-2018), Australian javelin thrower
Jarrod Baxter (born 1979), former fullback in the NFL
Jarrod Bleijie (born 1982), Australian politician and member of the Queensland Parliament
Jarrod Bowen (born 1996), English professional footballer
Jarrod Bunch (born 1968), former American football running back
Jarrod Carland, Australian actor and singer
Jarrod Cooper (born 1978), American football safety
Jarrod Croker (born 1990), Australian rugby league player
Jarrod Cunningham (1968–2007), New Zealand rugby union fullback
Jarrod Dyson (born 1984), major league baseball outfielder
Jarrod Emick (born 1969), American musical theatre actor
Jarrod Englefield (born 1979), New Zealand cricketer
Jarrod Evans (born 1996), Welsh international rugby player
Jarrod Fletcher (born 1983), Australian amateur boxer
Jarrod Harbrow (born 1988), professional Australian rules footballer
Jarrod Jablonski, pioneering technical diver and record setting cave diver
Jarrod Kayler-Thomson (born 1985), Australian rules footballer
Jarrod Kenny (born 1985), New Zealand professional basketball player
Jarrod King, male badminton competitor for New Zealand
Jarrod Lyle (1981-2018), Australian professional golfer
Jarrod Marrs (born 1975), retired male breaststroke swimmer from the United States
Jarrod Martin, Republican member of the Ohio House of Representatives
Jarrod McCracken (born 1970), New Zealand former rugby league footballer
Jarrod Molloy (born 1976), Australian rules footballer
Jarrod Moseley (born 1972), Australian professional golfer
Jarrod Mullen (born 1987), Australian professional rugby league player
Jarrod O'Doherty, rugby league footballer of the 1990s and 2000s
Jarrod Patterson (born 1973), retired Major League Baseball third baseman
Jarrod Pughsley (born 1990), American football player
Jarrod Saffy (born 1984), Australian professional rugby union player
Jarrod Saltalamacchia (born 1985), Major League Baseball catcher
Jarrod Sammut (born 1987), Australian rugby league player
Jarrod Shoemaker (born 1982), professional triathlete based in Maynard, Massachusetts
Jarrod Silvester, Australian Rules Football player for AFL club Richmond
Jarrod Skalde (born 1971), Canadian ice hockey centre
Jarrod Smith (born 1984), New Zealand professional footballer
Jarrod Wallace (born 1991), Australian Rugby League player
Jarrod Washburn (born 1974), former Major League Baseball pitcher

See also
Jared
Jarod (disambiguation)

English masculine given names